Chomo Yummo is a  mountain in the Himalayas on the border between Sikkim in India and Tibet in China.

The term Chomo means "goddess" or "lady" in Tibetan.

History
Chomo Yummo was first climbed in 1911 by the Scottish alpinist Alexander Kellas with the help of sherpas.

See also
 Chomo Lhari
 Chomo Lonzo
 Chomolungma
 Chomolhari Kang

References

Six-thousanders of the Himalayas
Mountains of Tibet
Mountains of Sikkim
Mangan district